Qasraya  is a Syrian village located in Awj Nahiyah in Masyaf District, Hama.  According to the Syria Central Bureau of Statistics (CBS), Qasraya had a population of 982 in the 2004 census.

References 

Populated places in Masyaf District